Giovanni Paramithiotti was an Italian sporting director. He was one of the founders and first chairman of the football club Internazionale Milano (1908–1909).

Biography  
Giovanni Paramithiotti was born in Venice from a wealthy family of Albanian origins. In the 18th century, his ancestors escaped the Ottoman conquest, joining Albanian diaspora. They moved away from Chameria, in the region of Epirus, and precisely from the current area of Paramythia, and preserved their origin of being from Paramythia with the surname Paramithiotti. They moved to Venice, Italy.

He was one of the founders of Inter Milan in 1908 after losing ties with A.C. Milan, and was elected as the first chairman of the new football club, remaining in office for only one year. According to the chronicles of the time, Paramithiotti was not particularly liked by the supporters due to his reputation as a jinx, which forced him not to show up at the stadium. However, one day, he was not recognised because he was watching the match with a fake beard and moustache, and as Inter won the match his bad reputation was put to an end.

In 1909, after one year, he was succeeded by Ettore Strauss his place, following the wishes of the Swiss majority of the club's members.

He died in New York City on 11 March 1943.

References 

Inter Milan chairmen and investors
Italian football chairmen and investors
1943 deaths